"Bones of Love" is the first single from the album Indecent Songs (which was released in Poland in 2003). The album was recorded by a duet: Anita Lipnicka and John Porter. In Poland the album in known as Nieprzyzwoite piosenki.

"Bones of Love" was released on 20 October 2003 and immediately was a huge success. It reached number one in almost all of the charts. The video to this song was nominated for The Yach Video Award in three categories: Viewer's Choice, Best Montage and The Video Of The Year.

The song was written by John Porter. Although released on the Polish market the song is in English.

Except for appearing on the Indecent Songs album it also appeared on the complication All The Stories (2006) and its live version appeared on a mini-disc Other Stories (2006).

2003 songs